Alejandro Jair Cabeza Jiménez (born 11 March 1997) is an Ecuadorian professional footballer who plays as a forward for Ecuadorian Serie A club Emelec and the Ecuador national team.

Club career
A youth academy graduate of Independiente del Valle, Cabeza made his first team debut on 20 July 2016 in a 5–2 league defeat against El Nacional. He scored his first goal on 4 December 2016 in a 2–1 league win against Fuerza Amarilla.

On January 6, 2021, Cabeza was loaned to C.S. Emelec from Independente del Valle.

International career
Cabeza received maiden call-up to senior team in November 2019 for friendlies against Trinidad and Tobago and Colombia. He made his senior team debut on 15 November 2019 in 3–0 win against Trinidad and Tobago.

Career statistics

International

Honours
Independiente del Valle
Copa Sudamericana: 2019

References

External links
 

1997 births
Living people
Association football forwards
Ecuadorian footballers
Ecuador international footballers
Ecuadorian Serie A players
C.S.D. Independiente del Valle footballers
S.D. Aucas footballers
C.S. Emelec footballers